Chosen is a ghost town in Palm Beach County, Florida near Belle Glade, Florida and Lake Okeechobee. The deadly 1928 Okeechobee hurricane devastated the area.

History
The Mayaimi established mounds in the area. A town was established by J. R. (John Robert) Leatherman, a Christian pietist Dunkard from Virginia. A school was established in 1921.

Alan Lomax and Zora Neale Hurston planned to visit the area during a recording expedition.

Isaac W. West was nominated to be postmaster.

Legacy
A historical marker commemorates the community.

References

Ghost towns in Florida
Former populated places in Palm Beach County, Florida